is a district located in Ibaraki Prefecture, Japan.

Town
Daigo

Merger
On December 1, 2004, the town of Kanasagō, and the villages of Satomi and Suifu merged into the expanded city of Hitachiōta.

Districts in Ibaraki Prefecture